Joseph Ignatius Maria "Joost" Hoffscholte (born 31 August 1942) is a retired Dutch politician of the People's Party for Freedom and Democracy (VVD). He served as Mayor of Dalen from 1 October 1977 until 25 June 1985 when he became Mayor of Aalsmeer serving from 25 June 1985 until 1 September 2007.

References

1942 births
Living people
Dutch nonprofit directors
Dutch jurists
Knights of the Order of Orange-Nassau
Mayors in North Holland
People from Aalsmeer
Mayors in Drenthe
People's Party for Freedom and Democracy politicians
University of Amsterdam alumni
Politicians from Amsterdam